Hen and chicken is a common name for several unrelated groups of plants. The name refers to the tendency of certain of these species to reproduce vegetatively by means of plantlets. These tiny plants are produced by the mother plant, and take root on touching the ground.

The name may refer to:

Chlorophytum comosum, the commonly cultivated houseplant
Sempervivum & Jovibarba, two related genera of small succulent plant species, commonly called "Hen and chicks" 
Echeveria, a genus of succulent plant species 
Sedum, a genus of succulent plant species 
Bergenia, a non-succulent Asian plant genus
Asplenium bulbiferum, the "hen and chicken fern" of New Zealand

See also
Hen and chicks